Metabacetus is a genus of beetles in the family Carabidae, containing the following species:

 Metabacetus arrowi Straneo, 1938
 Metabacetus hermani Will & Park, 2008
 Metabacetus immarginatus Bates, 1892
 Metabacetus jeanneli Straneo, 1938
 Metabacetus laotinus Straneo, 1938
 Metabacetus perakianus Straneo, 1938
 Metabacetus vandoesburgi Straneo, 1948

References

Pterostichinae